The following lists events the happened during 2016 in Gabon.

Incumbents
 President: Ali Bongo Ondimba
 Prime Minister: Daniel Ona Ondo (until September 28), Emmanuel Issoze-Ngondet (from September 28)

Events

August
 August 28 - Both President Bongo and Jean Ping claim victory in yesterday's presidential election.
 August 31 - After Ali Bongo is declared President, violence breaks out with Ping supporters as protesters set fire to the parliament building.

September
 September 1 - Large explosions and gunfire are heard around the capital of Libreville as security forces clash with demonstrators and the military bombs the building of Jean Ping's party, killing 2. The internet is also cut off in the capital.
 September 7 - President Bongo rejects calls for a recount in the disputed election.

References

Links

 
Years of the 21st century in Gabon
Gabon
Gabon
2010s in Gabon